Shark Kill is a 1976 made-for-television adventure film directed by William A. Graham. The film was one of the first films released to capitalize on the success of the 1975 film Jaws; both films follow the premise of men hunting a bloodthirsty great white shark.

Cast
 Richard Yniguez as Cabo Mendoza
 Phillip Clark as Rick Dayner
 Jennifer Warren as Carolyn
 Elizabeth Gill as Bonnie
 Victor Campos as Luis
 David Huddleston as Bearde

Release
The film was first broadcast on NBC on May 20, 1976, and was released on DVD on January 17, 2007.

See also
 List of killer shark films

References

External links
 

1976 films
1970s English-language films
1976 television films
1970s adventure films
Films directed by William Graham (director)
Films about shark attacks
Films about sharks
American television films
American adventure films
1970s American films